Burutu is a  Local Government Area in Delta State, Nigeria. It has served as a link between river transport and the sea when the Royal Niger Company established a base there in the late 19th century. People living in this region are mostly of the Izon ethnicity.

Burutu towns and villages 
Burutu Local Governments comprises the following towns and villages;

 Burutu-Forcados: Burutu, Forcados, Keremo2
 Iduwun:  include the following neighbourhoods; Kolorugbene, Odimodi, Osamayigben
 Ogulagha:  include the following neighbourhoods; Benibayo, Ogulagha, Yobebe, Yokrisobo
 Obatebe:  include the following neighbourhoods; Abadima, Okorogbene, Kalagfionene, Kenlogbene, Obatebe, Opuapale
 Ngbilebiri/Main:  include the following neighbourhoods; Agbodobiri, Akparegmobini, Amasuomo, Biokorgha, Egodor, Egologbene, Gbekebor, Kiagbo, New Town, Ngbilebiri, Ogbeingbene, Ogbolugbiri, Okrika, Yayogbene, Zion-Oyagbene.
 Operemor: include the following neighbourhoods; Abadiama, Bolu-Ojobo, Bolou Ndoro, Egrangbene, Ekogbene, Ekumugbene, Ojobo, Rougbene.
 Seimibiri: has the following localities; Dunu-Ogusu, Edegbene, Nikorogha, Oboro, Ogbene, Okpokunon, Okuamo
 Toumo: Bolua-Tamigbe, Botu-Mangbebe, Bolu-Tebegbe, Douebido-zion, Founkoro-Gbene, Isreallo-zion, Ogbogbabene, Toru-Temigbe, Torugbene, Toubo Town.

Economic activities
In the first half of the twentieth century the town expanded as a result of activities of the Niger Company and later UAC which acquired the trading interest of the Niger Company and its assets at Burutu. Prior to the beginning of the twentieth century, the main port of the Niger Company was at Akassa but when the water channel that opens to the sea became silted, the company moved operations Westward to Burutu close to Forcados. Burutu then served as a port terminal for Niger Company and  UAC, discharging goods from ships for onward water transport to river ports in Northern Nigeria and French territories through rivers Niger and Benue.

The port of Burutu was owned by UAC but was later acquired by Nigeria Port Authority.

External links

http://cas.umkc.edu/GeoSciences/LCAM/NIGER_DELTA/PAGES/N_Burutu_FocusGroup.htm

References

Port cities and towns in Nigeria
Local Government Areas in Delta State
Populated coastal places in Nigeria